Cheung Chau Tung Wan Beach is a gazetted beach facing Tung Wan on the east coast of Cheung Chau, Hong Kong. The beach is managed by the Leisure and Cultural Services Department of the Hong Kong Government. The beach is 230 metres long and is rated as Grade 1 by the Environmental Protection Department for its water quality. It is one of the two beaches in Cheung Chau along with Kwun Yam Beach and the beach is the largest in the island.

History
The rock carvings located near the beach were reported by geologists in 1970 and were gazetted as declared monuments of Hong Kong in 1982.

Usage
The beach is long and narrow and the whole journey will take 15 minutes and the beach is where Hong Kong's first Olympic medallist, Lee Lai-shan, practised windsurfing when she was young.

Features
The beach has the following features:
 Changing rooms
 Showers
 Toilets
 Water sports centre

See also
 Beaches of Hong Kong

References

External links 

 Official website

Cheung Chau
Beaches of Hong Kong